North Mitrovica or North Kosovska Mitrovica, is a town and municipality located in Mitrovica District in Kosovo. As of 2015, it has a population of 29,460 inhabitants.

North Mitrovica is a part of North Kosovo, a region with an ethnic Serb majority. The municipality was established in 2013 after North Kosovo crisis, previously being the settlement of the city of Mitrovica, divided by the Ibar river.

Following the 2013 Brussels Agreement, the municipality is planned to be the administrative center of the Community of Serb Municipalities.

Name
The northern part of Mitrovica (formerly "Kosovska Mitrovica") was commonly referred to as "North(ern) Kosovska Mitrovica" (/Severna Kosovska Mitrovica), however, as of late, the northern part is referred to as simply North Mitrovica (/Severna Mitrovica).

History
The city was officially part of Mitrovica, until its official separation in 2013. The separation came as a result of the North Kosovo crisis, following Kosovo's declaration of independence from Serbia in February 2008. The municipality was recognized by the Government of Kosovo in 2013 before the Kosovo local elections.

The city served as the de facto capital of the North Kosovo region which refused to work with the institutions of the Republic of Kosovo. Therefore, local Serbs formed the Assembly of Community of Municipalities, supported only by Serbia.

However, with the signing of the 2013 Brussels Agreement after the North Kosovo crisis, between the governments of Kosovo and Serbia, Serbia officially dropped its support for the assembly, agreeing to create a new Community of Serb Municipalities, an association of municipalities with Serb majority in Kosovo.

Its assembly will have no legislative authority and the judicial authorities will be integrated and operate within the Kosovo legal framework.

Administration
The Municipal Assembly of North Mitrovica has 19 deputies, one of whom is the speaker. There are currently 17 active councilors.

Demographics

According to the 2011 estimations by the Government of Kosovo, North Mitrovica has 3,393 households and 12,326 inhabitants.

In 2015, according to a report by OSCE, the population of North Mitrovica Municipality stands at 29,460 inhabitants.

Ethnic groups
The majority of North Mitrovica municipality is composed of Kosovo Serbs with more than 22,530 inhabitants (76.4%). Also, 4,900 (16.6%) Kosovo Albanians and 2,000 others live in the municipality.

The ethnic composition of the municipality of North Mitrovica, including IDPs:

Culture and education
North Mitrovica currently represents the most important political, cultural, educational and health centres for Serbs in Kosovo. It is the largest urban area in Kosovo where Serbs form the ethnic majority. The University of Priština is located in the area, having relocated from Pristina to Mitrovica during the Kosovo War. In 2013, after November elections in Kosovo, North Mitrovica officially became a separate municipality.

Sport
The FK Trepča Sever and Rudar Kosovska Mitrovica are football clubs that are located in this part of the city. Currently FK Trepca plays in Serbian fourth-tier Morava Zone League while FK Rudar Kosovska Mitrovica plays in the fifth-tier Football First League of North Kosovo.

Twin towns – sister cities

  Banja Luka, Bosnia and Herzegovina

   Kraljevo, Serbia

Gallery

See also
 New Bridge, Mitrovica

Annotations

References

External links

 Official Website

 
Cities in Kosovo
Serb communities in Kosovo
Mitrovica, Kosovo
2013 establishments in Kosovo